The 2023 Colorado Rockies season will be the 31st in Major League Baseball. It will be their 29th season at Coors Field.

Offseason

Rule changes 
Pursuant to the CBA, new rule changes will be in place for the 2023 season:

 institution of a pitch clock between pitches;
 limits on pickoff attempts per plate appearance;
 limits on defensive shifts requiring two infielders to be on either side of second and be within the boundary of the infield; and
 larger bases (increased to 18-inch squares);

Coaching staff changes
On October 13, 2022, the Rockies mutually parted ways with hitting coach Dave Magadan and reassigned third-base coach Stu Cole to a minor league position. Magadan had been the Rockies hitting coach since the 2019 season, and Cole had been the third-base coach since the 2013 season. On November 7, 2022, the Rockies announced they had hired the New York Yankees' assistant hitting coach Hensley Meulens as their hitting coach for the 2023 season, and had promoted the Albuquerque Isotopes' manager Warren Schaeffer to the position of third-base coach.

Roster departures
On November 6, 2022, Alex Colomé, Carlos Estévez, José Iglesias, Chad Kuhl, and José Ureña declared free agency. On November 8, 2022, the Rockies declined their 2023 option on Scott Oberg. On November 9, 2022, Dom Núñez was claimed off of waivers by the San Francisco Giants, Ryan Vilade was claimed off of waivers by the Pittsburgh Pirates, and Ty Blach, Helcris Olivarez, and Wynton Bernard were outrighted to Triple-A Albuquerque Isotopes. The Rockies announced they had non–tendered utility player Garrett Hampson, immediately making him a free agent, on November 18, 2022.

Roster additions

On November 15, the Rockies selected the contracts of infielder Warming Bernabel, pitcher Blair Calvo, infielder Julio Carreras, outfielder Brenton Doyle, and pitcher Riley Pint.

Free agent signings
Starting pitcher José Ureña re-signed with the Rockies to a one–year contract on November 11, 2022. Relief pitcher Brent Suter was claimed off of waivers by the Rockies from the Milwaukee Brewers on November 18, 2022. The Rockies signed relief pitcher Pierce Johnson to a one-year contract on December 13, 2022. Relief pitcher Nick Mears was claimed off of waivers from the Texas Rangers on January 6, 2023.

Trades
On November 6, 2022, the Rockies traded outfielder Sam Hilliard to the Atlanta Braves for minor league pitcher Dylan Spain. On November 15, 2022, the Rockies traded minor league infielder Juan Brito to the Cleveland Guardians for outfielder Nolan Jones. On December 6, 2022 the Rockies traded pitcher Chad Smith to the Oakland Athletics for minor league pitcher Jeff Criswell. On December 18, 2022, the Rockies traded outfielder Connor Joe to the Pittsburgh Pirates for minor league pitcher Nick Garcia. On January 17, 2023, the Rockies acquired Connor Seabold from the Boston Red Sox for cash considerations or a player to be named later.

Spring Training
On January 27, 2023, the Rockies announced 22 non-roster invitees for spring training, including top prospects outfielder Zac Veen and catcher Drew Romo. On March 4, 2023, the Rockies signed relief pitcher Brad Hand to a one-year deal. On March 5, the Rockies signed infielder Mike Moustakas to a minor-league deal. Both signings were made after injuries to players already on the roster; relief pitcher Lucas Gilbreath and second baseman Brendan Rodgers.

Regular season

Game Log  

|- style="background: 
| 1 || March 30 || @ Padres || – || || || — || || – ||
|- style="background: 
| 2 || March 31 || @ Padres || – || || || — || || – ||
|- style="background: 
| 3 || April 1 || @ Padres || – || || || — || || – ||
|- style="background: 
| 4 || April 2 || @ Padres || – || || || — || || – ||
|- style="background: 
| 5 || April 3 || @ Dodgers || – || || || — || || – ||
|- style="background: 
| 6 || April 4 || @ Dodgers || – || || || — || || – ||
|- style="background: 
| 7 || April 6 || Nationals || – || || || — || || – ||
|- style="background: 
| 8 || April 7 || Nationals || – || || || — || || – ||
|- style="background: 
| 9 || April 8 || Nationals || – || || || — || || – ||
|- style="background: 
| 10 || April 9 || Nationals || – || || || — || || – ||
|- style="background: 
| 11 || April 10 || Cardinals || – || || || — || || – ||
|- style="background: 
| 12 || April 11 || Cardinals || – || || || — || || – ||
|- style="background: 
| 13 || April 12 || Cardinals || – || || || — || || – ||
|- style="background: 
| 14 || April 14 || @ Mariners || – || || || — || || – ||
|- style="background: 
| 15 || April 15 || @ Mariners || – || || || — || || – ||
|- style="background: 
| 16 || April 16 || @ Mariners || – || || || — || || – ||
|- style="background: 
| 17 || April 17 || Pirates || – || || || — || || – ||
|- style="background: 
| 18 || April 18 || Pirates || – || || || — || || – ||
|- style="background: 
| 19 || April 19 || Pirates || – || || || — || || – ||
|- style="background: 
| 20 || April 20 || @ Phillies || – || || || — || || – ||
|- style="background: 
| 21 || April 21 || @ Phillies || – || || || — || || – ||
|- style="background: 
| 22 || April 22 || @ Phillies || – || || || — || || – ||
|- style="background: 
| 23 || April 23 || @ Phillies || – || || || — || || – ||
|- style="background: 
| 24 || April 24 || @ Guardians || – || || || — || || – ||
|- style="background: 
| 25 || April 25 || @ Guardians || – || || || — || || – ||
|- style="background: 
| 26 || April 26 || @ Guardians || – || || || — || || – ||
|- style="background: 
| 27 || April 28 || Diamondbacks || – || || || — || || – ||
|- style="background: 
| 28 || April 29 || Diamondbacks || – || || || — || || – ||
|- style="background: 
| 29 || April 30 || Diamondbacks || – || || || — || || – ||
|- 
 

|- style="background: 
| 30 || May 2 || Brewers || – || || || — || || – ||
|- style="background: 
| 31 || May 3 || Brewers || – || || || — || || – ||
|- style="background: 
| 32 || May 4 || Brewers || – || || || — || || – ||
|- style="background: 
| 33 || May 5 || @ Mets || – || || || — || || – ||
|- style="background: 
| 34 || May 6 || @ Mets || – || || || — || || – ||
|- style="background: 
| 35 || May 7 || @ Mets || – || || || — || || – ||
|- style="background: 
| 36 || May 8 || @ Pirates || – || || || — || || – ||
|- style="background: 
| 37 || May 9 || @ Pirates || – || || || — || || – ||
|- style="background: 
| 38 || May 10 || @ Pirates || – || || || — || || – ||
|- style="background: 
| 39 || May 12 || Phillies || – || || || — || || – ||
|- style="background: 
| 40 || May 13 || Phillies || – || || || — || || – ||
|- style="background: 
| 41 || May 14 || Phillies || – || || || — || || – ||
|- style="background: 
| 42 || May 15 || Reds || – || || || — || || – ||
|- style="background: 
| 43 || May 16 || Reds || – || || || — || || – ||
|- style="background: 
| 44 || May 17 || Reds || – || || || — || || – ||
|- style="background: 
| 45 || May 19 || @ Rangers || – || || || — || || – ||
|- style="background: 
| 46 || May 20 || @ Rangers || – || || || — || || – ||
|- style="background: 
| 47 || May 21 || @ Rangers || – || || || — || || – ||
|- style="background: 
| 48 || May 22 || Marlins || – || || || — || || – ||
|- style="background: 
| 49 || May 23 || Marlins || – || || || — || || – ||
|- style="background: 
| 50 || May 24 || Marlins || – || || || — || || – ||
|- style="background: 
| 51 || May 25 || Marlins || – || || || — || || – ||
|- style="background: 
| 52 || May 26 || Mets || – || || || — || || – ||
|- style="background: 
| 53 || May 27 || Mets || – || || || — || || – ||
|- style="background: 
| 54 || May 28 || Mets || – || || || — || || – ||
|- style="background: 
| 55 || May 29 || @ Diamondbacks || – || || || — || || – ||
|- style="background: 
| 56 || May 30 || @ Diamondbacks || – || || || — || || – ||
|- style="background: 
| 57 || May 31 || @ Diamondbacks || – || || || — || || – ||
|- 
 

|- style="background: 
| 58 || June 1 || @ Diamondbacks || – || || || — || || – ||
|- style="background: 
| 59 || June 2 || @ Royals || – || || || — || || – ||
|- style="background: 
| 60 || June 3 || @ Royals || – || || || — || || – ||
|- style="background: 
| 61 || June 4 || @ Royals || – || || || — || || – ||
|- style="background: 
| 62 || June 6 || Giants || – || || || — || || – ||
|- style="background: 
| 63 || June 7 || Giants || – || || || — || || – ||
|- style="background: 
| 64 || June 8 || Giants || – || || || — || || – ||
|- style="background: 
| 65 || June 9 || Padres || – || || || — || || – ||
|- style="background: 
| 66 || June 10 || Padres || – || || || — || || – ||
|- style="background: 
| 67 || June 11 || Padres || – || || || — || || – ||
|- style="background: 
| 68 || June 12 || @ Red Sox || – || || || — || || – ||
|- style="background: 
| 69 || June 13 || @ Red Sox || – || || || — || || – ||
|- style="background: 
| 70 || June 14 || @ Red Sox || – || || || — || || – ||
|- style="background: 
| 71 || June 15 || @ Braves || – || || || — || || – ||
|- style="background: 
| 72 || June 16 || @ Braves || – || || || — || || – ||
|- style="background: 
| 73 || June 17 || @ Braves || – || || || — || || – ||
|- style="background: 
| 74 || June 18 || @ Braves || – || || || — || || – ||
|- style="background: 
| 75 || June 19 || @ Reds || – || || || — || || – ||
|- style="background: 
| 76 || June 20 || @ Reds || – || || || — || || – ||
|- style="background: 
| 77 || June 21 || @ Reds || – || || || — || || – ||
|- style="background: 
| 78 || June 23 || Angels || – || || || — || || – ||
|- style="background: 
| 79 || June 24 || Angels || – || || || — || || – ||
|- style="background: 
| 80 || June 25 || Angels || – || || || — || || – ||
|- style="background: 
| 81 || June 27 || Dodgers || – || || || — || || – ||
|- style="background: 
| 82 || June 28 || Dodgers || – || || || — || || – ||
|- style="background: 
| 83 || June 29 || Dodgers || – || || || — || || – ||
|- style="background: 
| 84 || June 30 || Tigers || – || || || — || || – ||
|- 
 

|- style="background: 
| 85 || July 1 || Tigers || – || || || — || || – ||
|- style="background: 
| 86 || July 2 || Tigers || – || || || — || || – ||
|- style="background: 
| 87 || July 4 || @ Astros || – || || || — || || – ||
|- style="background: 
| 88 || July 5 || @ Astros || – || || || — || || – ||
|- style="background: 
| 89 || July 7 || @ Giants || – || || || — || || – ||
|- style="background: 
| 90 || July 8 || @ Giants || – || || || — || || – ||
|- style="background: 
| 91 || July 9 || @ Giants || – || || || — || || – ||
|-style="text-align:center; background:#bbcaff;"
|colspan="11"|93rd All-Star Game in Seattle, Washington
|- style="background: 
| 92 || July 14 || Yankees || – || || || — || || – ||
|- style="background: 
| 93 || July 15 || Yankees || – || || || — || || – ||
|- style="background: 
| 94 || July 16 || Yankees || – || || || — || || – ||
|- style="background: 
| 95 || July 18 || Astros || – || || || — || || – ||
|- style="background: 
| 96 || July 19 || Astros || – || || || — || || – ||
|- style="background: 
| 97 || July 21 || @ Marlins || – || || || — || || – ||
|- style="background: 
| 98 || July 22 || @ Marlins || – || || || — || || – ||
|- style="background: 
| 99 || July 23 || @ Marlins || – || || || — || || – ||
|- style="background: 
| 100 || July 24 || @ Nationals || – || || || — || || – ||
|- style="background: 
| 101 || July 25 || @ Nationals || – || || || — || || – ||
|- style="background: 
| 102 || July 26 || @ Nationals || – || || || — || || – ||
|- style="background: 
| 103 || July 28 || Athletics || – || || || — || || – ||
|- style="background: 
| 104 || July 29 || Athletics || – || || || — || || – ||
|- style="background: 
| 105 || July 30 || Athletics || – || || || — || || – ||
|- style="background: 
| 106 || July 31 || Padres || – || || || — || || – ||
|- 
 

|- style="background: 
| 107 || August 1 || Padres || – || || || — || || – ||
|- style="background: 
| 108 || August 2 || Padres || – || || || — || || – ||
|- style="background: 
| 109 || August 4 || @ Cardinals || – || || || — || || – ||
|- style="background: 
| 110 || August 5 || @ Cardinals || – || || || — || || – ||
|- style="background: 
| 111 || August 6 || @ Cardinals || – || || || — || || – ||
|- style="background: 
| 112 || August 7 || @ Brewers || – || || || — || || – ||
|- style="background: 
| 113 || August 8 || @ Brewers || – || || || — || || – ||
|- style="background: 
| 114 || August 9 || @ Brewers || – || || || — || || – ||
|- style="background: 
| 115 || August 10 || @ Dodgers || – || || || — || || – ||
|- style="background: 
| 116 || August 11 || @ Dodgers || – || || || — || || – ||
|- style="background: 
| 117 || August 12 || @ Dodgers || – || || || — || || – ||
|- style="background: 
| 118 || August 13 || @ Dodgers || – || || || — || || – ||
|- style="background: 
| 119 || August 14 || Diamondbacks || – || || || — || || – ||
|- style="background: 
| 120 || August 15 || Diamondbacks || – || || || — || || – ||
|- style="background: 
| 121 || August 16 || Diamondbacks || – || || || — || || – ||
|- style="background: 
| 122 || August 18 || White Sox || – || || || — || || – ||
|- style="background: 
| 123 || August 19 || White Sox || – || || || — || || – ||
|- style="background: 
| 124 || August 20 || White Sox || – || || || — || || – ||
|- style="background: 
| 125 || August 22 || @ Rays || – || || || — || || – ||
|- style="background: 
| 126 || August 23 || @ Rays || – || || || — || || – ||
|- style="background: 
| 127 || August 24 || @ Rays || – || || || — || || – ||
|- style="background: 
| 128 || August 25 || @ Orioles || – || || || — || || – ||
|- style="background: 
| 129 || August 26 || @ Orioles || – || || || — || || – ||
|- style="background: 
| 130 || August 27 || @ Orioles || – || || || — || || – ||
|- style="background: 
| 131 || August 28 || Braves || – || || || — || || – ||
|- style="background: 
| 132 || August 29 || Braves || – || || || — || || – ||
|- style="background: 
| 133 || August 30 || Braves || – || || || — || || – ||
|- 
 

|- style="background: 
| 134 || September 1 || Blue Jays || – || || || — || || – ||
|- style="background: 
| 135 || September 2 || Blue Jays || – || || || — || || – ||
|- style="background: 
| 136 || September 3 || Blue Jays || – || || || — || || – ||
|- style="background: 
| 137 || September 4 || @ Diamondbacks || – || || || — || || – ||
|- style="background: 
| 138 || September 5 || @ Diamondbacks || – || || || — || || – ||
|- style="background: 
| 139 || September 6 || @ Diamondbacks || – || || || — || || – ||
|- style="background: 
| 140 || September 8 || @ Giants || – || || || — || || – ||
|- style="background: 
| 141 || September 9 || @ Giants || – || || || — || || – ||
|- style="background: 
| 142 || September 10 || @ Giants || – || || || — || || – ||
|- style="background: 
| 143 || September 11 || Cubs || – || || || — || || – ||
|- style="background: 
| 144 || September 12 || Cubs || – || || || — || || – ||
|- style="background: 
| 145 || September 13 || Cubs || – || || || — || || – ||
|- style="background: 
| 146 || September 14 || Giants || – || || || — || || – ||
|- style="background: 
| 147 || September 15 || Giants || – || || || — || || – ||
|- style="background: 
| 148 || September 16 || Giants || – || || || — || || – ||
|- style="background: 
| 149 || September 17 || Giants || – || || || — || || – ||
|- style="background: 
| 150 || September 18 || @ Padres || – || || || — || || – ||
|- style="background: 
| 151 || September 19 || @ Padres || – || || || — || || – ||
|- style="background: 
| 152 || September 20 || @ Padres || – || || || — || || – ||
|- style="background: 
| 153 || September 22 || @ Cubs || – || || || — || || – ||
|- style="background: 
| 154 || September 23 || @ Cubs || – || || || — || || – ||
|- style="background: 
| 155 || September 24 || @ Cubs || – || || || — || || – ||
|- style="background: 
| 156 || September 26  || Dodgers || – || || || — || || – ||
|- style="background: 
| 157 || September 26  || Dodgers || – || || || — || || – ||
|- style="background: 
| 158 || September 27 || Dodgers || – || || || — || || – ||
|- style="background: 
| 159 || September 28 || Dodgers || – || || || — || || – ||
|- style="background: 
| 160 || September 29 || Twins || – || || || — || || – ||
|- style="background: 
| 161 || September 30 || Twins || – || || || — || || – ||
|- style="background: 
| 162 || October 1 || Twins || – || || || — || || – ||
|-

Season standings

National League West

National League Wild Card

Roster

Farm system

On January 13, 2023, the Rockies announced the coaching staffs of their Minor League affiliates.

References

External links
2023 Colorado Rockies schedule at MLB.com
2023 Colorado Rockies season at Baseball Reference

Colorado Rockies seasons
Colorado Rockies
Colorado Rockies
2020s in Denver